Zygmunt Ochmański (2 October 1922 – 10 June 2003) was a Polish footballer. He played in one match for the Poland national football team in 1949.

References

External links
 

1922 births
2003 deaths
Polish footballers
Poland international footballers
Association footballers not categorized by position